is a Japanese racing driver who currently competes in the Super Formula Championship and Super GT with Team Mugen Team Goh and Modulo Nakajima Racing respectively.

Career

Early career
Otsu started his motorsport career in karting in 2007, in which he remained active until 2010. In 2013, he switched to formula racing to participate in the Suzuka Circuit Racing School Formula, which is only intended to train drivers. In 2014, he competed in the JAP Japanese Formula 4 Championship and finished fifth in the FC class. In 2015, he made the move to the new Japanese Formula 4 Championship, where he raced as a Honda protégé for the Honda Formula Dream Project team. He took five podiums and finished third in the final standings with 108 points, behind Sho Tsuboi and Tadasuke Makino.

Japanese Formula 3
In 2016, Otsu made the move to the Japanese Formula 3 Championship, racing for the HFDP Racing team. He achieved five points finishes, with fifth place on the Okayama International Circuit as the best result. As a result, he finished tenth in the final standings with 6 points. In 2017, he made the move to the TODA Racing team within the class. During the season, he was on the podium six times before winning the season finale at the Sportsland SUGO. With 79 points, he finished fifth in the final standings behind Mitsunori Takaboshi, Sho Tsuboi, Álex Palou and Ritomo Miyata.

In 2019, Otsu returned to the series race with the ThreeBond Racing team. He took three podium finishes at Autopolis, Fuji Speedway and Twin Ring Motegi, finishing sixth in the standings with 36 points.

Super GT
In 2018, Otsu made his Super GT debut, sharing a Honda NSX GT3 with Ryo Michigami in the GT300 class for the Modulo Drago Corse team that Michigami owned. They achieved a podium finish at Autopolis and were fourteenth in the championship with 24 points.

In 2019, He took a podium place at Fuji with Michigami and finished seventeenth in the championship with 19 points.

In 2020, Otsu made the move to the GT500 class in Super GT, sharing a Honda NSX-GT GT500 with Takuya Izawa for the Modulo Nakajima Racing team. They achieved two pole positions at the Suzuka International Racing Course and Motegi, but were only on the podium at Motegi. With 31 points, the duo finished twelfth in the final standings.

Super Formula
At the end of the year, he made his debut in the Super Formula season finale with the TCS Nakajima Racing team at Fuji, replacing Tadasuke Makino who suffered from meningitis and needed rest. He finished thirteenth in the race.

In 2021 Otsu made his full-time debut in Super Formula with Team Mugen together with Team Goh under the Red Bull colours. He went on to get his first pole position in the series and win the race in the sixth round of the season at Motegi.

Racing record

Career summary

‡ Team standings.
* Season still in progress.

Complete Super Formula results
(key) (Races in bold indicate pole position) (Races in italics indicate fastest lap)

* Season still in progress.

References

External links
 

1994 births
Living people
Japanese racing drivers
Japanese Formula 3 Championship drivers
Super GT drivers
Super Formula drivers
Nakajima Racing drivers
Mugen Motorsports drivers
Dandelion Racing drivers
Japanese F4 Championship drivers